Merz (art style) is a synonym for the more common expression and term Dada, and traces back to Kurt Schwitters.

Origin
Merz was conceptualized by Kurt Schwitters, who planned a Dada section in Hanover. However, upon being denied an invitation to the First International Dada Fair in Berlin in 1920, Schwitters wished to establish a subsect of the Dada movement that tailored to his own artistic philosophies and visions. In his own words, he wished to find a "totally unique hat fitting only a single head"— his own.

Etymology
The name Merz was generated by chance through a collage that incorporated the German word Kommerz (commerce). The resulting word, which was nonsensical and spontaneously generated, was similar in origin and philosophy to the title of Dada. Merz became Schwitters 's synonym for his own approach to Dada.

Characteristics 
Like Dada, Merz was characterized by spontaneity and frequently made use of found objects. One of the most significant Merz artifacts constructed by Schwitters is the Merzbau, a tower-sized sculpture assembled from refuse and ephemera that occupied the inside of his apartment and existed from 1927 to 1943, when it was destroyed by a British air raid during World War II.

Reception
Kurt Schwitters, a pioneer in fusing collage and abstraction— influenced Robert Rauschenberg, Jasper Johns,  the Fluxus movement and Joseph Beuys, too.

See also
 Kurt Schwitters
 Dada
 Fluxus
 Joseph Beuys
 Robert Rauschenberg
 Jasper Johns
 Louise Nevelson

References

External links
 See, for example, about Merz Picture 32 A, 1921 
 See about his last of all works, the Merzbarn Wall 
Art movements
Western art
20th century
1920 in art
Merz